Kunos Simulazioni s.r.l. is an Italian software development studio that specializes in creating driving simulations. The company is headquartered at the ACI Vallelunga Circuit near Rome and was established in 2005 with the goal of developing software for varying needs from solutions for professional racing teams to consumer software.

The studio's latest major title, Assetto Corsa, was released on 19 December 2014 on Microsoft Windows and received critical acclaim upon its release. A console version of Assetto Corsa for PlayStation 4 and Xbox One in partnership with publisher 505 Games was announced in June 2015 and was released in August 2016.

The company was purchased by 505's parent company Digital Bros S.p.A. in 2017.

In February 2018 the company announced Assetto Corsa Competizione, a new title with the official Blancpain GT Series licence, which released on 12 September 2018 in the Steam Early Access program. It left early access on 29 May 2019. A console version was released 23 June 2020 for Playstation 4 and Xbox One.

Games developed

References

External links
 
 

Companies based in Rome
Italian companies established in 2005
Software companies of Italy
Video game companies established in 2005
Video game companies of Italy
Video game development companies
2017 mergers and acquisitions